The 1968 FIBA Intercontinental Cup was the 3rd edition of the FIBA Intercontinental Cup for men's basketball clubs. It took place at Palestra and Spectrum, Philadelphia. From the FIBA European Champions Cup participated Real Madrid and Simmenthal Milano, from the South American Club Championship participated Botafogo, and from the NABL participated the Akron Wingfoots.

Participants

Semi finals
January 4, Palestra, Philadelphia

|}

3rd place game
January 6, Spectrum, Philadelphia

|}

Final
January 6, Spectrum, Philadelphia

|}

Final standings

External links
1968 Intercontinental Basketball Cup

1968
1967–68 in American basketball
1967–68 in European basketball
1967–68 in South American basketball
International basketball competitions hosted by the United States